Bologna Corticella is a railway station serving the suburb of Corticella, part of the city of Bologna, in the region of Emilia-Romagna, northern Italy. The station is located on the Padua–Bologna railway. All train services are operated by Trenitalia Tper.

The station is currently managed by Rete Ferroviaria Italiana (RFI), a subsidiary of Ferrovie dello Stato Italiane (FSI), Italy's state-owned rail company.

Location
Bologna Corticella railway station is located north of the city centre.

History
The station was activated in 1864.

It was downgraded to railway halt on 30 November 2003.

Features
The station consists of four tracks linked by an underpass.

Train services

The station is served by the following service(s):
 Suburban services (Treno suburbano) on line S4A, Bologna - Ferrara

See also

 List of railway stations in Bologna
 List of railway stations in Emilia-Romagna
 Bologna metropolitan railway service

References 

Railway stations in Bologna